Do You Believe? is a 2015 American Christian drama film directed by Jon Gunn and stars an ensemble cast featuring Ted McGinley, Mira Sorvino, Andrea Logan White, Lee Majors, Alexa PenaVega, Sean Astin, Madison Pettis, Cybill Shepherd, and Brian Bosworth. The film is distributed by Pure Flix, who released it on March 20, 2015.

Plot
When a pastor, Matthew, is shaken to the core by the visible belief of a street-corner preacher, he and a lot of other people who are also struggling with their own problems come together and start to question what their religious beliefs really mean.

Cast

 Mira Sorvino as Samantha
 Sean Astin as Dr. Farell
 Alexa PenaVega as Lacy
 Delroy Lindo as Street preacher with Cross
 Ted McGinley as Matthew
 Andrea Logan White as Andrea 
 Cybill Shepherd as Teri 
 Lee Majors as J.D. 
 Madison Pettis as Maggie
 Brian Bosworth as Joe
 Joseph Julian Soria as Carlos
 Tracy Melchior as Grace
 Valerie Domínguez as Elena
 Senyo Amuako as Kriminal 
 Liam Matthews as Bobby
 Shane Carson as Detective
 Delpaneaux Wills as 40 Ounce
 Makenzie Moss as Lily
 Shwayze as Percy "Pretty Boy"
 Arthur Cartwright as Little B

Reception

Box office
Do You Believe? opened theatrically in 1,320 venues on March 20, 2015, and earned $3,591,282 in its first weekend, ranking number six in the domestic box office, behind The Divergent Series: Insurgent, Cinderella, Run All Night, The Gunman, and Kingsman: The Secret Service.

Critical response
Do You Believe? received negative reviews from critics. The review aggregator website Rotten Tomatoes reported a 25% rating, based on 20 reviews, leaving a rating average of 4.4/10. On Metacritic, the film has a score of 22 out of 100, based on 6 critics, indicating "generally unfavorable reviews".

Film reviewer for The Dove Foundation, Edwin L. Carpenter starts his review with, "...the best faith-based film I have ever seen!" Writing for The Times-Picayune, Mike Scott describes the film as, "It is not mainstream entertainment; it is mainstream Sunday school – which is fine if this is what you want to see at the movie theater." Scott Foundas, Chief Film Critic at Variety magazine, pans the film with "But when all its threads are finally pulled into place, Do You Believe? proves about as spiritually enlightening as a Kmart throw rug."  Huffington Post'''s Jackie Cooper gave the film 7/10.

Michael Foust, writing for The Christian Post nominates the film as the new best evangelistic film ever, he goes on to reason, "The majority of movie critics will likely give it poor reviews, partially because it is more overtly evangelistic than any successful faith-based theatrical movie in recent history. But I'm guessing those who see the film will like it." Writing for RogerEbert.com, Peter Sobczynski reports, "Subtle as a sledgehammer to the toes and only slightly more entertaining, Do You Believe?'' will no doubt play well with viewers already predisposed towards liking it because it has been designed to reconfirm their already deeply-felt beliefs rather than doing anything that might cause them to think about or challenge those beliefs in any meaningful way." Newsday's Rafer Guzmán gave the film 0.5 stars out of 4 and criticized the cardboard characters and overly sentimental narratives, ultimately concluding that "the movie is primarily interested in asking a question that it has already answered.".

References

External links
 
 
 
 
 
 

2015 films
2015 drama films
American drama films
American independent films
Films about Christianity
Films about evangelicalism
Films about religion
Films set in Chicago
Films shot in Michigan
Pure Flix Entertainment films
Films produced by Russell Wolfe
2015 independent films
Films produced by David A. R. White
Films directed by Jon Gunn
2010s English-language films
2010s American films